Wild Thing is a 1987 film directed by Max Reid and starring Robert Knepper and Kathleen Quinlan. The screenplay was by John Sayles and the story by Larry Stamper. The film was distributed by the Atlantic Entertainment Group.

Plot
When his parents are killed in a botched drug deal, a young boy is taken in by a bag lady who teaches him about the Blue Coats (Cops) and White Coats (Doctors). After her death, he becomes an urban Tarzan defending innocents in a large city. He soon becomes an urban legend and champion of street justice, espousing a 1960s philosophy and coming to the aid of the helpless and oppressed. Jane (Kathleen Quinlan) is the concerned social worker who falls for the hero. Armed with a bow and arrow and makeshift equipment such as a grappling hook made from an old umbrella, he and his cat sidekick set out to avenge his parents death when he finds the drug dealer that killed them. The song Wild Thing by the rock band The Troggs is played as a sort of theme music for this unlikely hero, played by Robert Knepper.

Cast
 Robert Knepper as Wild Thing
 Kathleen Quinlan as Jane
 Robert Davi as Chopper
 Maury Chaykin as Jonathan Trask
 Betty Buckley as Leah
 Guillaume Lemay-Thivierge as Wild Thing (10 years old)
 Clark Johnson as Winston
 Sean Hewitt as Father Quinn
 Teddy Abner as Rasheed
 Cree Summer as Lisa
 Shawn Levy as Paul

References

External links 
 
 
 

1987 films
1987 directorial debut films
1980s English-language films
1987 drama films
1980s action drama films
1980s vigilante films
American action drama films
American vigilante films
Atlantic Entertainment Group films
Films scored by George S. Clinton
Films shot in Montreal
Films with screenplays by John Sayles
1980s American films